Odranski Obrež is a village in Central Croatia, located south of Zagreb. The population is 1,578 (census 2011).

References

Populated places in the City of Zagreb